La Cinéfondation is a foundation under the aegis of the Cannes Film Festival, created to inspire and support the next generation of international filmmakers.

It was created in 1998 by Gilles Jacob. Since then it has developed complementary programmes to help achieve its goal. Today it is divided into three different parts: 
The Selection
The Residence
The Atelier.

The Selection
Each year, the Cinéfondation selects 15 to 20 short and medium-length films presented by film schools from all over the world. Cinéfondation's Selection is a parallel section of the Official Selection of Cannes Film Festival.

Every year, more than 1,000 student films reach the Cinéfondation to present their film to la Sélection.
This selection of films is projected at the Cannes Festival and presented to the Cinéfondation and Shorts Jury, which awards prizes to the best three at an official Festival ceremony.

Prize winners

The Residence
The Residence du Festival is a programme for young international directors working on their first or second film. Each year twelve participants are selected and invited to live in Paris for four and a half months as they embark on a course designed to help them in the writing and production of their films, with help and support from film professionals.

The following 30 sessions have been conducted since the inception of the programme.

The Atelier
In 2005 the Festival asked the Cinéfondation to develop the Atelier with the aim of putting young filmmakers in touch with industry professionals. Each year the programme helps around twenty filmmakers gain international financing, meet producers, distributors and take part in the everyday life of the Festival.

Notes

References

Cannes Film Festival
Lists of films by award